"Molly" is a song by American recording artist Tyga, released March 29, 2013 as the first promotional single for his third studio album, Hotel California. The song has peaked at number 66 on the Billboard Hot 100. It heavily samples Cedric Gervais's 2012 single of the same name.

Music video 
On March 21, 2013 Tyga shot the music video for "Molly" with Wiz Khalifa and Mally Mall. It was shot in downtown Los Angeles and was directed by Colin Tilley. He described the video as "I, Robot meets Alice in Wonderland". On April 7, 2013, the music video was released.

Chart performance 
The song peaked at number 66 on the US Billboard Hot 100, and song spent a total of 11 weeks on the chart. On March 19, 2020, the single was certified platinum by the Recording Industry Association of America (RIAA) for combined sales and album-equivalent units over a million units in the United States.

Track listing

Charts

Weekly charts

Year-end charts

Certifications

References 

2013 singles
Cash Money Records singles
Tyga songs
Wiz Khalifa songs
Music videos directed by Colin Tilley
Songs written by Mally Mall
Songs written by Tyga
Songs written by Wiz Khalifa
Songs written by Jess Jackson (record producer)